The 2015 All-Ireland Minor B Hurling Championship was the most recent staging of the All-Ireland hurling championship for players under the age of eighteen since its establishment by the Gaelic Athletic Association. The championship began on 1 August 2015 and ended on 5 September 2015.

Kerry were the defending champions and successfully retained the title following a 6-17 to 1-8 defeat of Roscommon.

Results

Quarter-finals

Semi-finals

Final

References

External links
 2015 GAA master fixture list

2015 All-Ireland Minor B Hurling Championship